Todd White may refer to:
Todd White (American football) in 1988 Philadelphia Eagles season
Todd White (artist) (born 1969), American figurative expressionist painter
Todd White (golfer), American golfer in 2013 Walker Cup
Todd White (ice hockey), Canadian ice hockey player
Todd White (pastor), founder of Lifestyle Christianity Church